William Bayard Hale (1869 – April 10, 1924) was an American journalist. He wrote the 1912 campaign biography of Woodrow Wilson. Later, after souring on Wilson, he wrote a derisive critique of Wilson's literary style.

He is described in Barbara Tuchman's The Zimmerman Telegram as a German propaganda agent.

According to the Columbia Electronic Encyclopedia (6th edition, 2012),

He died in Munich on April 10, 1924.

References

American male journalists
1869 births
1924 deaths